Carlo Oriani (5 November 1888 – 3 December 1917) was an Italian professional road racing cyclist. The highlight of his career was his overall win in the 1913 Giro d'Italia.

He died in the aftermath of the Battle of Caporetto from pneumonia contracted as a result of diving into the icy waters of the Tagliamento river to save a fellow retreating soldier.

References

External links
 

1888 births
1917 deaths
Italian male cyclists
Giro d'Italia winners
Cyclists from the Metropolitan City of Milan
Italian Giro d'Italia stage winners
Italian military personnel killed in World War I
Deaths from pneumonia in Campania